Vít Bárta (born 5 December 1973) is a Czech politician and businessman who served as Minister of Transport from 2010 to 2011 and as Member of the Chamber of Deputies (MP) from 2010 to 2013. Bárta also led political party Věci veřejné during 2011–2013. In 2011 Bárta announced his resignation from the government due to prosecution when he was accused of bribery by his party colleagues.

Political career 
He was elected to the Chamber of Deputies of the Parliament of the Czech Republic and became a member of Petr Nečas' cabinet.

Controversy 
In April 2011, Bárta was accused of bribery by his colleagues from Public Affairs, deputies Jaroslav Škárka, Stanislav Huml, and Kristýna Kočí. The deputies were subsequently expelled from the party. The incident caused serious problems in the Czech government coalition.

On 8 April 2011, Bárta announced his resignation from the government of Petr Nečas.

A year later, in April 2012, Barta was convicted of bribery and conditionally sentenced to 18 months of imprisonment.

See also 
 Politics of the Czech Republic

References 

Living people
Members of the Chamber of Deputies of the Czech Republic (2010–2013)
Businesspeople from Prague
Transport ministers of the Czech Republic
1973 births
Public Affairs (political party) politicians
Politicians from Prague